Bobby Duncan (born 26 June 2001) is an English professional footballer who plays for Spanish club Linense, as a striker.

Early and personal life
Duncan was born in Whiston and raised in Prescot. He attended Cardinal Heenan Catholic High School and St Bede's College.

He is a cousin of Steven Gerrard. He is a lifelong Liverpool fan.

Club career
Duncan began his career with Mossley Hill, St Helens Town, Wigan Athletic and Manchester City.

He left Manchester City in August 2017, and spent a year without a club as they retained his registration, before signing a three-year professional contract with Liverpool in 2018. He was part of the side that won the 2018–19 FA Youth Cup, Liverpool's fourth triumph in the competition, scoring a late equaliser in the final against his former team Manchester City.

He made his senior debut for Liverpool in a pre-season friendly against Tranmere Rovers in July 2019, scoring the final goal in a 6–0 win.

In August 2019 he was linked with a move away from the club, and his family accused Liverpool of "bullying", which the club denied. He later expressed regret about how he had left Liverpool.

In September 2019 he signed for Italian club Fiorentina. He returned to England in September 2020, signing a three-year contract with Derby County. He made his senior debut on 9 January 2021, in a 2–0 FA Cup loss away at non-league club Chorley. At the start of the 2021–22 season he trained with Plymouth Argyle, although the clubs could not agree terms for a loan move.

In July 2022 he signed for Spanish club Linense.

International career
He has represented England at under-16 and under-17 youth level.

References

2001 births
Living people
English footballers
St Helens Town A.F.C. players
Wigan Athletic F.C. players
Manchester City F.C. players
Liverpool F.C. players
ACF Fiorentina players
Derby County F.C. players
Real Balompédica Linense footballers
Association football forwards
English expatriate footballers
English expatriates in Italy
Expatriate footballers in Italy
English expatriate sportspeople in Spain
Expatriate footballers in Spain
England youth international footballers